This is a list of notable Yoruba people.

Film and cinema

Nollywood

Actors and actresses

Writers and directors 

 Biyi Bandele (1967–2022), novelist, playwright and filmmaker
 Kemi Adesoye, screenwriter
 Kemi Adetiba (b. 1980), filmmaker, television director, music video director
 Kunle Afolayan (b. 1974), actor, film producer and director
 Meji Alabi
 Oyin Adejobi (1926–2000), dramatist and actor
 Tomi Adeyemi (b. 1993), Nigerian-American novelist and creative writing coach
 Tunde Kelani (b. 1948), filmmaker, storyteller, photographer, director and producer

Non-Nollywood

 Adepero Oduye
 Adewale Akinnuoye-Agbaje
 Alex Lanipekun
 Ariyon Bakare
 David Oyelowo
 Dayo Okeniyi
 Gbenga Akinnagbe
 Hakeem Kae-Kazim
 Isaach de Bankolé
 KSI
 John Boyega
 Richard Ayoade
 Rotimi
 Toks Olagundoye
 Sope Aluko
 Rick Famuyiwa
 Femi Emiola

Academics
 
 Akinwumi Ogundiran (b. 1966), archaeologist, historian, anthropologist, author of The Yoruba: A New History
 Bolaji Akinyemi (b. 1942), Nigerian professor of political science who was Nigeria External Affairs Minister in 1985-1987
 Bolanle Awe (b. 1933), Nigerian history professor
 Christopher Kolade (b. 1932), Nigerian diplomat and academic
 Hezekiah Ademola Oluwafemi (1919-1983), Vice-Chancellor of  Obafemi Awolowo University from 1966 to 1975
 Isaac Folorunso Adewole (b. 1954), Nigerian professor of gynaecology and obstetrics
 Kofoworola Ademola (1913-2002), educationist, first black African woman to earn a degree from Oxford University
 Lola Akande (b. 1965), academic, author, public relations professional. 
 Olanrewaju Fagbohun (b. 1966), academic, author, investor, professor of environmental law and a Senior Advocate of Nigeria
 Orishatukeh Faduma
 Oyeronke Oyewumi, sociologist, gender scholar
 Oyewusi Ibidapo-Obe (1949-2021), Nigerian professor of systems engineering, Vice-Chancellor of University of Lagos
 Solomon Babalola
 Stephen Adebanji Akintoye (b. 1935), academic, historian and writer
 Toyin Falola (b. 1953), historian and professor of African studies

Medicine

 Ameyo Stella Adadevoh (1956–2014), physician
 Babatunde Kwaku Adadevoh (1933–1997), physician, educational administrator, professor of chemical pathology
 Elizabeth Abimbola Awoliyi (1910–1971), first woman to practise as a physician in Nigeria
 Latunde Odeku (1927–1974), neurosurgeon
 Olikoye Ransome-Kuti (1927–2003), paediatrician, activist and health minister of Nigeria
 Oni Akerele (d. 1983), Nigeria's first indigenous surgeon
 Orisadipe Obasa (1863–1940), doctor and prince
 Segun Toyin Dawodu (b. 1960), physician

Journalism and the media

 Adeola Fayehun (b. 1984), journalist
 Abraham Adesanya (1922–2008), Nigerian politician, lawyer, activist, welfarist and liberal progressive
 Dele Giwa (1947–1986), journalist, editor and founder of Newswatch magazine
 Dele Momodu (b. 1960), journalist/publisher, businessman and motivational speaker
 Dotun Adebayo (b. 1960), British radio presenter, writer and publisher
 Femi Adesina, journalist
 Femi Oke (b. 1966), British television presenter and journalist
 Henry Dele Alake
 Kayode Soyinka
 Kehinde Bankole (b. 1985), actress, model and television host
 Kitoye Ajasa (1866–1937), Nigerian lawyer and legislator during the colonial period, first Nigerian to be knighted
 Laolu Akande
 Laura Ikeji
 Mosunmola Abudu (b. 1964), Nigerian media mogul and philanthropist
 Oluremi Oyo (1952-2014), Nigerian veteran journalist
 Omoyele Sowore (b. 1971), Nigerian human rights activist, founder of an online news agency Sahara Reporters
 Reuben Abati (b. 1965), journalist, politician, television anchor and newspaper columnist
 Seun Osewa (b. 1982), Nigerian internet entrepreneur
 Tolu Ogunlesi (b. 1982), Nigerian journalist, poet, photographer, fiction writer and blogger

Visual arts

Artists

 Laolu Senbanjo (b. 1982), Nigerian visual artist, musician, singer/songwriter and former human rights attorney
 Aina Onabolu (1882–1963), pioneering Nigerian modern arts teacher and painter
 Ibiyinka Alao (b. 1975), Nigerian American artist, architect, writer, film director and musical theater composer
 Kehinde Wiley
 Nike Davies-Okundaye (b. 1951), Nigerian batik and adire textile designer
 Olowe of Ise (c. 1873 – c. 1938), wood sculptor
 Yusuf Grillo (1934-2021), Nigerian painter

Photography

 Bayo Omoboriowo (b. 1987), Nigerian photojournalist and documentary photographer
 Lola Akinmade Åkerström. photographer and travel writer
 Rotimi Fani-Kayode (1955–1989), Nigerian-born photographer
 TY Bello

Politics and administration

Politics

 Adebayo Salami (1951–2021), Senator, chieftain of All Progressives Congress
 Adekunle Fajuyi (1926–1966), first military governor of Western Region, Nigeria
 Adeyemo Alakija (1884–1952), lawyer, politician, businessman, president of Egbe Omo Oduduwa
 Akinwunmi Ambode (b. 1963), Governor of Lagos State, Nigeria from 2015 to 2019
 Ayodele Fayose (b. 1960), Governor of Ekiti State
 Babajide Sanwo-Olu (b. 1965), Governor of Lagos State from 2019
 Babalola Borisade (1946–2017), Federal Minister of Nigeria
 Babatunde Fashola (b. 1963), lawyer and politician, former Governor of Lagos State
 Benjamin Adekunle (1936–2014), Nigerian Army Brigadier
 Bola Ige (1930–2001), lawyer and politician
 Bola Tinubu (b. 1952), national leader of All Progressives Congress
 Bukola Saraki (b. 1962), 13th President of the Senate of Nigeria
 Christopher Omoworare Babajide (b. 1968), Nigerian politician
 Desmond Elliot (b. 1974), Nigerian actor, director and politician
 Dolapo Osinbajo
 Dipo Dina (1960–2010), politician, philanthropist, administrator
 Ernest Shonekan (1936-2022), Nigerian lawyer and statesman
 Femi Fani-Kayode (b. 1960), Nigerian politician, essayist, poet and lawyer
 Femi Gbaja Biamila (b. 1962), Nigerian lawyer
 Femi Hamzat (b. 1964), Nigerian politician
 Francis Adenigba Fadahunsi (b. 1952), Nigerian senator and retired custom officer
 Frederick Fasehun (1935–2018), Nigerian medical doctor, hotel owner and politician
 Funsho Williams (1948–2006), politician from Lagos State
 Gbenga Daniel (b. 1956), Nigerian politician, Governor of Ogun State from 2003 to 2011
 Gboyega Oyetola (b. 1954), 9th Governor of Osun State
 Herbert Macaulay (1864–1946), Nigerian nationalist, politician, surveyor, engineer, architect, journalist and musician
 Ibikunle Amosun (b. 1958), Nigerian politician, Governor of Ogun State from 2011 to 2019
 Joseph Fadahunsi
 Kayode Fayemi (b. 1935), Nigerian politician, Governor of Ekiti State
 Kofo Abayomi (1896–1979), Nigerian ophthalmologist and politician
 Lawan Gwadabe (b. 1949), Military Administrator of Niger State from 1987 to 1992
 Lola Young
 M.K.O. Abiola
 Mudashiru Obasa
 Nicolas Grunitzky
 Oladipo Diya
 Obafemi Awolowo
 Olu Falae
 Oluremi Tinubu
 Olusegun Aganga
 Olusegun Mimiko
 Olusegun Obasanjo
 Olusegun Oni
 Yemi Osinbajo
 Oyinkansola Abayomi
 Rauf Aregbesola
 Rotimi Akeredolu
 Samuel Akintola
 Seyi Makinde
 Thomas Boni Yayi
 Alhaji Abdul Azeez Kolawole Adeyemo
 Tunde Idiagbon
 Bode Thomas
 Rotimi Akeredolu
 Olusegun Mimiko
 Victor Adebowale (b. 1962), People's peer, current chair of the NHS Confederation
 Yemi Osinbajo (b. 1957), Nigerian lawyer and politician, Vice-President of Nigeria since 2015

Administration 
 Akinwumi Adesina (b. 1960), President of African Development Bank since 2015
 Joseph Oladele Sanusi (b. 1938), Governor of the Central Bank of Nigeria from 1999 to 2004
 Olumuyiwa Benard Aliu (b. 1960), fifth President of the Council of the International Civil Aviation Organization
 Oye Owolewa (b. 1989), Nigerian-American pharmacist and politician
 Wally Adeyemo (b. 1981), Deputy Treasury Secretary, United States of America.

African diaspora

Brazil

 Cândido da Fonseca Galvão
 Osifekunde
 Pacifico Licutan

Canada
 Thomas Peters

Cuba

 Carlota (d. in battle in 1844), one of the leaders of the slave rebellion in the Triunvirato plantation
 José Antonio Aponte

Suriname
 Johannes Alabi

Trinidad and Tobago
 Victor Pascall (1886–1930), cricketer

United States

 Oluwale Kossola (Cudjoe Lewis)
 Matilda McCrear
 Redoshi (Sally Smith)
 Scipio Vaughan

Aristocrats

Monarchs

 Abdul-Lateef Adeniran Akanni Ojikutujoye I (b. 1958), Olofin Adimula of Ado-Odo
 Adebiyi Adegboye Adesida Afunbiowo II (1950–2013), traditional ruler of the Akure Kingdom
 Adedotun Aremu Gbadebo III (b. 1943), Alake of Egbaland
 Adeniji Adele (1893–1964), Oba of Lagos
 Adesoji Aderemi (1889–1980), Ooni of Ife
 Adeyeye Enitan Ogunwusi (b. 1974), Ooni of Ile-Ife
 Adeyinka Oyekan (1911–2003), second Christian Oba of Lagos
 Ajaka, Oyo Emperor
 Ajimudaoro Aladesanmi I (r. 1886–1910), Ewi of Ado Ekiti
 Daniel Aladesanmi II (1902–1983), Ewi of Ado Ekiti
 Folagbade Olateru Olagbegi III (1941–2019)
 Fredrick Kumokun Adedeji Haastrup (1820–1901), Oba Obokun of Ilesa, first Christian Oba of Yorubaland
 Ladapo Ademola (1872–1962), Alake of Abeokuta
 Lamidi Adeyemi (b. 1938-2022), Alaafin of Oyo
 Moremi Ajasoro (12th century), legendary queen and folk heroine of the Yoruba people
 Oba, Orisha of the river Oba
 Oduduwa, divine king, according to tradition, first Ooni of Ife (r. c. 1100 AD), ancestor of many dynasties
 Olagbegi Atanneye I (r. 1913–1938), paramaunt ruler of Owo Kingdom
 Olagbegi Atanneye II
 Olateru Olagbegi I (r. 1913–1938)
 Olateru Olagbegi II (1910–1998)
 Olubuse II (1930–2015), traditional ruler of Ife
 Oranyan, legendary founder of Oyo
 Orompoto (16th century), female Alaafin of Oyo
 Oshun
 Osupa
 Oya
 Oyekan I
 Rilwan Akiolu
 Rufus Aladesanmi III
 Samuel Akinsanya
 Shango
 Sikiru Kayode Adetona (b. 1934), Awujale of the Ijebu Kingdom

Chiefs and princes

 Abibatu Mogaji (1916–2013), business magnate
 Abiola Dosunmu
 Adeniran Ogunsanya
 Afe Babalola
 Bisoye Tejuoso
 Christopher Sapara Williams
 Efunroye Tinubu
 Efunsetan Aniwura
 Gaha
 Gani Adams
 Henry Fajemirokun
 H.O. Davies
 John Otunba Payne (1839–1906), Nigerian sheriff, administrator and diarist
 MKO Abiola
 Moses Majekodunmi
 Oluyole
 Oguntola Sapara
 Richard Akinjide
 Roseline Osipitan
 Sara Forbes Bonetta
 Sunday Igboho
 Tejumade Alakija
 T.O.S. Benson
 Yemi Elebuibon
 Yemisi Adedoyin Shyllon

Sports

Football (soccer)

 Adebayo Adeleye (b. 2000), goalkeeper
 Adebayo Akinfenwa
 Ademola Lookman
 Arnaut Danjuma
 Asisat Oshoala
 Ayila Yussuf
 Babajide Collins Babatunde
 Best Ogedegbe
 Bukayo Saka
 David Alaba
 Dele Ajiboye
 Dele Alli
 Dominic Solanke
 Emmanuel Adebayor
 Eniola Aluko
 Femi Ajilore
 Fikayo Tomori
Folarin Balogun
 Funso Ojo
 Ibraheem Jabaar
 Jamal Musiala
 Jamil Muhammad
 Jodel Dossou
 John Fashanu
 Junior Ajayi
 Junior Olaitan
 Karim Adeyemi
 Kevin Schade
 Leon Balogun (b. 1988), defender for the Nigeria national football team
 Manuel Akanji
 Mathieu Adeniyi (b. 1987), Beninense football player
 Michael Obafemi (b. 2000), Irish professional footballer
 Mohammed Nur (b. 2002), Nigerian international footballer who plays as a striker
 Mudashiru Lawal (1954-1991), Nigerian footballer who played as a midfielder
 Nathan Delfouneso
 Nathan Tella (b. 1999), English professional footballer who plays as a midfielder
 Olufolasade Adamolekun
 Omar Sowunmi
 Obafemi Martins (b. 1984), Nigerian professional footballer
 Patrick Owomoyela (b. 1979), German former professional footballer
 Peter Odemwingie (b. 1981), retired Nigerian professional footballer who played as a forward and a winger
 Rabiu Afolabi
 Rasheedat Ajibade
 Rasheed Yekini (1963-2012), Nigerian professional footballer who played as a striker
 Razak Omotoyossi (b. 1985), Beninese professional footballer
 Sammy Ameobi
 Saturnin Allagbé (b. 1993), player for the Benin national football team
 Sheyi Ojo
 Segun Odegbami (b. 1952), Nigerian former professional footballer who played as forward
 Simon Sohm
 Sone Aluko
 Shola Ameobi (b. 1981), Nigerian former professional footballer who played as a striker
 Steve Mounie
 Taiwo Awoniyi
 Taye Taiwo (b. 1985), Nigerian professional footballer
 Thomas Sowunmi
 Tobi Jnohope, footballer
 Tobi Sho-Silva (b. 1995), English professional footballer
 Tosin Adarabioyo (b. 1997), English professional footballer
 Yakubu Aiyegbeni (b. 1982), Nigerian former professional footballer who played as a striker

Football coaches

 Festus Onigbinde (b. 1938), Nigerian football manager
 Segun Odegbami (b. 1952), Nigerian former professional footballer who played as a forward
 Yemi Tella (c. 1951 - 2007), coach of the Nigerian football team

Basketball
 
 Alex Antetokounmpo 
 Bam Adebayo
 Gani Oladimeji Lawal Jr.
 Giannis Antetokounmpo
 Hakeem Olajuwon
 Kostas Antetokounmpo (b. 1997), Greek professional basketball player
 Michael Olowokandi (b. 1975), Nigerian former professional basketball player
 Olu Famutimi (b. 1984), Canadian professional basketball player
 Thanasis Antetokounmpo (b. 1992), Greek professional basketball player
 Victor Oladipo (b. 1992), American professional basketball player

Combat sports

 Anthony Joshua (b. 1989), British professional boxer and two-time former unified world heavyweight champion
 Kamaru Usman (b. 1987), Nigerian-American professional mixed martial artist and former freestyle wrestler
 Israel Adesanya (b. 1989), Nigerian-born New Zealand professional mixed martial artist, kickboxer, and former professional boxer
 Benny Adegbuyi (b. 1985), Romanian kickboxer and professional boxer
 Muhammed Lawal (b. 1981), American professional wrestler and retired mixed martial artist
 Ola Afolabi (b. 1980), British professional boxer

Volleyball
 Foluke Akinradewo (b. 1987), indoor volleyball player

American football
 Kabeer Gbaja-Biamila (b. 1977), former American football defensive end

Ice hockey
 Jarome Iginla

Track and field athletes

 Daley Thompson
 Femi Ogunode
 Karim Olowu
 Olabisi Afolabi (b. 1975), retired track and field athlete from Nigeria
 Oludamola Osayomi
 Olusoji Fasuba (b. 1984), Nigerian sprinter
 Tobi Amusan (b. 1997),  Nigerian hurdler who also competes as a sprinter. World record holder in the 100m hurdles.
 Yakubu Adesokan (b. 1979), Nigerian powerlifter

 Kriss Akabusi (b. 1958), track and field athlete, Olympic, Commonwealth Games, and European Championships medal winner, 400m hurdle record holder

Squash and Table tennis
 Adewale Amao (b. 1990), Nigerian professional squash player
 Segun Toriola (b. 1974), Nigerian professional table tennis player

Music

African

Pre-2000s

Post-2000s

 9ice (b. 1980), Nigerian musician, songwriter and dancer
 Adekunle Gold (b. 1987), Nigerian highlife singer, songwriter and graphic designer
 Aramide (b. 1985), Nigerian afro-soul singer and songwriter
 Aṣa
 Asake
 Ayọ
 Ayo Jay
 Ayra Starr
 Barry Jhay
 Bella Shmurda
 Brymo
 CDQ
 Chinko Ekun
 D'banj
 Davido
 DJ Cuppy
 Dotman
 Eedris Abdulkareem
 eLDee
 Falz
 Femi Kuti
 Femi Leye
 Fireboy DML
 Jaywon
 JME
 Joeboy
 Kizz Daniel
 Korede Bello
 Ladipoe
 L.A.X
 Laycon (b. 1993), Nigerian media personality, rapper, singer and songwriter
 Lil Kesh (b. 1994), Nigerian singer, rapper and songwriter
 Little Simz
 Lojay
 Lyta
 Maleek Berry (b. 1987), British-Nigerian record producer and recording artist
 Mayorkun (b. 1994), Nigerian singer, songwriter and pianist
 MohBad
 Mr Eazi
 Mz Kiss
 Naira Marley
 Niniola
 Olamide
 Olu Maintain
 Oxlade (singer)
 Qdot
 Queen Fumi
 Reekado Banks
 Reminisce
 Ruger
 Seun Kuti
 Seyi Shay
 Skepta
 Shola Allyson
 Simi
 Small Doctor
 Sound Sultan
 Taio Cruz
 Tems
 Teni
 Tiwa Savage
 Tope Alabi
 Wale
 Wande Coal
 Wizkid
 Yemi Alade
 Yinka Ayefele
 Ycee (b. 1993), Nigerian rapper, singer and songwriter
 Zeynab
 Zlatan (b. 1994), Nigerian singer, songwriter, musician and dancer

Directors and DJs

 Clarence Peters
 DJ Cuppy
 DJ Caise, Nigerian disc jockey
 DJ Jimmy Jatt (b. 1966), Nigerian disc jockey
 DJ Neptune
 DJ Spinall (b. 1984), Nigeriand disc jockey, record producer, songwriter, label executive and media personality
 DJ Xclusive (b. 1980), Nigerian disc jockey, recorder producer and recording artist
 DJ Tunez
 D'Tunes
 Kiddominant (b. 1992), Nigerian recording producer, songwriter and artist
 Pheelz (b. 1994), Nigerian record producer and songwriter

Diaspora

Modelling and fashion 

 Deola Sagoe
 Yetunde Barnabas (b. 1990), Nigerian model, beauty queen, actress and film producer

Science and technology

Theatre

Online influencers

Military

Businesspeople

Religion

Christianity

Anglican

Catholic

Pentecostal

Other

Islam

Yoruba Religion

Law, activism and advocacy

Writers

Yorùbá language

English language

References 

 
Yoruba-related lists
Yoruba